The Ulster Junior Cup is a rugby union competition for clubs in the Irish province of Ulster that are not considered strong enough to play in the Ulster Senior Cup. It also includes the second teams of the senior clubs. The perpetual trophy that is awarded to the winners is called The Balmoral Cup

The most successful club is Queen's University with 15 wins. The current holder is Ballynahinch.

Performance by Club

Finals

1880s and 90s

1900s

1910s

1920s

1930s

1940s

1950s

1960s

1970s

1980s

1990s

2000s

2010s

2020s

Sources

Rugby union competitions in Ulster
1888 establishments in Ireland